The Murdered Model (French: Le mannequin assassiné) is a 1948 French-Belgian comedy crime film directed by Pierre de Hérain and starring Blanchette Brunoy, Gilbert Gil and Julien Carette. It is based on the 1932 novel The Murdered Model by Stanislas-André Steeman. The film's sets were designed by the art director Lucien Aguettand. It marked the screen debut of Anne Vernon who went on to star in French and British films.

Synopsis
A mannequin stolen from the a shop window is found stabbed to death. It bears a curious resemblance to a man who was killed a year before.

Cast
 Blanchette Brunoy as Laure
 Gilbert Gil as Armand
 Julien Carette as Léonisse 
 Daniel Gélin as 	Léopold 
 Jean-Roger Caussimon as 	Jérôme 
 Anne Vernon as 	Irène 
 Jacques Castelot as 	Emile
 Jacques Sevrannes as 	Gilbert 
 Robert Balpo as Le chef de train 
 Geneviève Callix as 	Rose
 André Gabriello as Charles 
 Pierre Magnier as 	Le notaire
 Albert Dinan as 	Didier 
 Stanislas-André Steeman as 	Le docteur Furnelle
 Mathilde Casadesus as Madame Malaise
 Robert Lussac as Le commissaire Aimé Malaise
 Germaine Dermoz as Irma
 Albert Broquin as Un consommateur
 Sylvain as Le clerc de notaire

References

Bibliography 
 Goble, Alan. The Complete Index to Literary Sources in Film. Walter de Gruyter, 1999.

External links 
 

1948 films
French crime films
Belgian crime films
1948 crime films
1940s French-language films
Films based on Belgian novels
Films directed by Pierre de Hérain
French-language Belgian films
1940s French films
Films based on works by Stanislas-André Steeman